The 2004 UCF Golden Knights football team represented the University of Central Florida in the 2004 NCAA Division I-A football season. Their head coach was George O'Leary, in his first season with the team. It was their last year in the Mid-American Conference, in the East Division. The Golden Knights would join Conference USA for the 2005 season.

The Golden Knights went 0–11, their worst season in program history. With four losses to end the 2003 season, the UCF finished the season sitting on a 15-game losing streak.

Schedule

Roster

References

UCF
UCF Knights football seasons
College football winless seasons
UCF Golden Knights football